Kelley is a city in Story County, Iowa, United States. The population was 304 at the time of the 2020 census. It is part of the Ames, Iowa Metropolitan Statistical Area, which is a part of the larger Ames-Boone, Iowa Combined Statistical Area.

History
A post office was established at Kelley in 1875, and remained in operation until it was discontinued in 2013. The city was named after George Kelley, one of the town's earliest residents.

Geography
Kelley's longitude and latitude coordinates in decimal form are 41.950914, -93.664905.

Demographics

2010 census
As of the census of 2010, there were 309 people, 120 households, and 91 families living in the city. The racial makeup of the city was 98.4% White, 0.6% African American, 0.3% Asian, and 0.6% from two or more races. Hispanic or Latino of any race were 1.0% of the population.

There were 120 households, of which 37.5% had children under the age of 18 living with them, 57.5% were married couples living together, 13.3% had a female householder with no husband present, 5.0% had a male householder with no wife present, and 24.2% were non-families. 20.0% of all households were made up of individuals, and 3.3% had someone living alone who was 65 years of age or older. The average household size was 2.58 and the average family size was 2.96.

The median age in the city was 35.1 years. 26.9% of residents were under the age of 18; 9.3% were between the ages of 18 and 24; 26.8% were from 25 to 44; 27.5% were from 45 to 64; and 9.4% were 65 years of age or older. The gender makeup of the city was 50.2% male and 49.8% female.

2000 census
As of the census of 2000, there were 300 people, 109 households, and 80 families living in the city. The racial makeup of the city was 99.00% White, 0.33% Native American, and 0.67% from two or more races.

There were 109 households, out of which 41.3% had children under the age of 18 living with them, 63.3% were married couples living together, 8.3% had a female householder with no husband present, and 25.7% were non-families. 22.0% of all households were made up of individuals, and 6.4% had someone living alone who was 65 years of age or older. The average household size was 2.75 and the average family size was 3.25.

In the city, the population was spread out, with 32.3% under the age of 18, 7.3% from 18 to 24, 38.0% from 25 to 44, 16.7% from 45 to 64, and 5.7% who were 65 years of age or older. The median age was 32 years. For every 100 females, there were 98.7 males. For every 100 females age 18 and over, there were 91.5 males.

The median income for a household in the city was $54,375, and the median income for a family was $57,344. Males had a median income of $31,964 versus $22,000 for females. The per capita income for the city was $17,574. None of the families and 1.0% of the population were living below the poverty line.

Education
The Ballard Community School District operates local area public schools.

References

External links

 
Welcome to Kelly Portal style community website
City-Data Comprehensive statistical data and more about Kelley

Cities in Iowa
Cities in Story County, Iowa
1875 establishments in Iowa
Populated places established in 1875